Guddan Tumse Na Ho Payega is an Indian Hindi television series which aired from 3 September 2018 to 26 January 2021 on Zee TV and is digitally available on the ZEE5. It was produced by Ved Raj for Shoonya Square Productions, the series starred Kanika Mann and Nishant Singh Malkani. after a leap it starred Kanika Mann and Savi Thakur. It replaced Zindagi Ki Mehek in its timeslot. It was later replaced by Teri Meri Ikk Jindri.

Plot
Guddan Gupta, a kind young woman in Indore, marries billionaire chef Akshat Jindal to save her step-sister's life. Guddan's mother died when she was young; she was raised by her father, Bhushan Gupta, and stepmother Kaushlya Gupta, who dislikes her. Guddan feels guilty for being unable to save her birth mother. Her stepmother criticizes her, saying "Guddan Tumse Na Ho Payega!" Guddan's support system is Bhushan and her step-sister, Revati Gupta.
 
Widower Akshat Jindal lost his first wife, Antara, in a traumatic accident which drove him into a world of his own. An unemotional, no-nonsense person, he is a father figure to his three nephews (the children of his elder brother, Avinash Jindal) and their wives. They love and fears from him.
 
Guddan marries Akshat; although she annoys him, he protects and supports her. She slowly develops self-confidence, and he begins to feel emotions he does not understand. Earlier in their marriage, Akshat thought that Guddan married him for his money; later, he begins to appreciate her innocence and kindness. During their wedding reception, he learns that Kaushlya deceitfully arranged their marriage. After realizing that he had misunderstood Guddan, Akshat begins to trust her and appreciates her care for his mother.
 
Police officer Vikram Rawat, Antara's elder brother, forced Guddan to stay with Akshat to collect evidence that Akshat killed Antara.
Although Guddan hides her knowledge about Vikram's intentions from Akshat and the rest of the family, she defends Akshat when Vikram arrests him. Akshat learns that Guddan was staying at his house to gather evidence against him, and breaks her mangala sutra. 
 
Akshat's younger brother, Angad Jindal, is mentally ill and was believed to be partially responsible for Antara's death. Akshat hides Angad from the police, and is annoyed when Guddan brings Angad back to Akshat's house.
 
The entire Jindal family celebrates Holi in Goa, Akshat tries to replace Guddan's mangala sutra; however, she wants him to do so when he accepts her with his heart and not from social pressure. After Angad stabs Akshat, Akshat accepts Guddan wholeheartedly as his wife.
 
Antara, thought to be dead, reappears and tries to destroy Akshat and Guddan's relationship as Guddan's faith in him is shaken. Angad gets killed by Antara's henchmen. On Akshat and Guddan's honeymoon (arranged by Angad), AJ shoots her and she falls from a cliff.
 
When AJ sees Guddan, he is shocked. Revati has married Inspector Parv Singh. Guddan asks AJ why he shot her. He says that he wanted to keep her from learning about Revati's hatred of her, which Guddan knows was fueled by Antara. Guddan confronts Revati, who wants to destroy Guddan and Akshat's happiness.

Alisha (Akshat and Antara's daughter) appears at the Jindal house during a pooja. A devastated Guddan leaves Akshat, although they still love each other. She begins a relationship with AJ, and believes that she is pregnant with their child. Antara tries to kill her, and is arrested. When AJ thinks that Guddan has aborted the baby because he is working with Antara, he marries Antara in revenge.

Four years later, Guddan is a successful actress in Mumbai. In Indore, Akshat has become an impoverished alcoholic; Antara runs the house. Guddan comes to Indore to promote her film, and she and Akshat meet again. Akshat and Guddan meet several times leading them to clear their misunderstandings. They reunite and consummate their marriage whereas Guddan is revealed to be a pregnant. The family enjoys good time; Guddan gives birth to a baby girl, they name her as Choti Guddan. Then arrives Avinash and Ganga; Akshat's elder brother and his wife whom Dadi refuses to forgive initially. But Guddan makes Dadi forgive them. Avinash and Ganga pretend to be nice in the beginning but soon show  their true colors they kidnap Choti Guddan. Akshat and Guddan rescue their baby but they lose their life.

20 years later

Choti Guddan is all grown up and looks just like Badi Guddan she runs Akshat's restaurant. Agastya joins Guddan as her manager and steals her restaurant for his mother, Pushpa. Later it is revealed that he is Chikoo. The show ends with Agastya and Choti Guddan's reunion and return of Guddan (Choti Guddan's mother). At last it is shown that Guddan is missing Akshat and talking to his photo hang on wall.

Cast

Main
Kanika Mann as 
Guddan Gupta Jindal: Sumati and Bhushan's daughter; Kaushalya's step-daughter; Revati's half-sister; Akshat's widow; Jr. Guddan's mother; Alisha's step-mother (2018–2020)
Jr. Guddan Jindal Birla: Guddan and Akshat's daughter; Alisha's half-sister; Agastya's wife (2020–2021)
Nishant Singh Malkani as Akshat "AJ" Jindal: Kalpana's second son; Avinash and Angad's brother; Antara's ex-husband; Guddan's husband; Alisha and Jr. Guddan's father (2018–2020) (Dead)
 Savi Thakur as Agastya Birla: Pushpa's son; Arushi's brother; Jr. Guddan's husband (2020–2021)

Recurring
 Shweta Mahadik as Durga Chaubey Jindal: Rocky's sister; Kishore's wife; Aarav's mother (2018–2020)
 Sehrish Ali as Lakshmi Jindal: Vardaan's wife (2018–2020)
 Rashmi Gupta as Saraswati Singh Jindal: Parv's sister; Rahul's wife (2018–2020)
 Dalljiet Kaur as Antara Rawat Jindal: Vikram's sister; Akshat's ex-wife; Alisha's mother (2019–2020)
 Rehaan Roy as Police Inspector Parv Singh: Saraswati's brother; Siddhi's husband (2018–2020)
 Lalit Singh as Goon: Restaurant from Guddan (2020)
 Daljeet Soundh as Kalpana Jindal: Avinash, Angad and Akshat's mother; Kishore, Vardaan, Rahul, Alisha and Jr. Guddan's grandmother; Aarav's great-grandmother (2018–2020)
 Shrishti Mitra as Revati Gupta: Bhushan and Kaushalya's daughter; Guddan's half-sister (2018–2020)
 Anuj Kohli as Kishore Jindal: Avinash's eldest son; Ganga's step-son; Rahul and Vardaan's brother; Durga's husband; Aarav's father (2018–2020)
 Mayank Verma as Vardaan Jindal: Avinash's youngest son; Ganga's step-son; Kishore and Rahul's brother; Lakshmi's husband (2018–2020)
 Trishna Vivek as Kaushalya Gupta: Bhushan's second wife; Revati's mother; Guddan's step-mother; Jr. Guddan's step-grandmother (2018–2020)
 Subhasish Chakraborty as Bhushan Gupta: Sumati's widower; Kaushalya's husband; Guddan and Revati's father; Jr. Guddan's grandfather (2018–2020)
 Sikandar Kharbanda as Avinash Jindal: Kalpana's eldest son; Angad and Akshat's brother; Ganga's husband; Kishore, Vardaan and Rahul's father; Aarav's grandfather (2020)
 Neha Yadav as Ganga Jindal: Avinash's second wife; Kishore, Vardaan and Rahul's step-mother (2020)
 Jatin Shah as Vikram Rawat: Antara's brother (2018–2019)
 Anjali Ujawane as Shanti Gupta (2019)
 Garima Dixit as Siddhi Singh: Parv's wife (2018–2019)
 Manan Joshi as Rocky Chaubey: Durga's brother (2019)
 Achal Tankwal as Angad Jindal: Kalpana's youngest son; Akshat and Avinash's brother; Revati's lover (2019)
 Palak Jain as Alisha Jindal Goel: Antara and Akshat's daughter; Guddan's step-daughter; Jr. Guddan's half-sister; Vikrant's wife (2019)
 Pawan Shankar as Vikrant Goel: Alisha's husband; Akshat's enemy (2019)
Anahita Jhanbaksh as Pushpa Birla: Agastya and Arushi's mother (2020–2021)
Nirmala J Chandra as Sonalika Birla: Agastya and Arushi's aunt; Money's mother (2020-2021)
Dhrasti Bhanushali as Rashi Birla (2020–2021)
Pratham Kunwar as Mani Birla: Sonalika's son; Agastya and Arushi's cousin (2020–2021)
Abhinandan Jindal as Aarav Jindal: Durga and Kishore's son (2020–2021)
Shalini Mahal as Aarushi Birla: Pushpa's daughter; Agastya's sister (2020–2021)
Piyush Singh as Vinay: Antara’s Assistant

Production

In January 2020, the series timeline advanced four years. Its production and broadcast were halted indefinitely in late March 2020 due to the COVID-19 outbreak in India. Filming of television series and films was halted on 19 March. It was expected to resume on 1 April, but could not; the series' remaining episodes were broadcast on 24 March. Production resumed on 28 June 2020, with broadcasts scheduled to resume on 13 July.

In April 2020, a special episode was filmed at the cast members' homes. On 22 June 2020, Guddan Tumse Na Ho Payega began streaming on the ZEE5 digital platform as lockdown-special episodes in which the cast reminisced about past episodes and discussed their lockdown routines.

In May 2020, amid rumors that Nishant Singh Malkani was leaving the series, the time jump was cited as a factor. Malkani said, "Because post leap they will be showing a story of a young girl who is supposedly Guddan and my daughter. Since Kanika (Mann) will be playing the daughter's role as well, it makes sense for her but does not leave much scope for me. I won't be able to play a 50-year-old father and they also don't want me to play that at this age. So it is a mutual decision," Producer Ved Raj said about the time jump, "This decision has nothing to do with the lockdown. We had planned to introduce a time leap and a new track much before that. We realized that there was nothing left to explore in the original story. The new storyline seems promising. It's just that the plan couldn't be executed earlier because everything came to a halt owing to the lockdown." 
The series' audience was unhappy with the time shift and Malkani's departure, expressing their displeasure in emails and on social media.   Savi Thakur, known for his role in Porus, joined the cast in August 2020 as male lead Agastya Birla in the new timeline.

Adaptations

Soundtrack

Guddan Tumse Na Ho Payega soundtrack was composed by Puneet Dixit.

References

External links
 Guddan Tumse Na Ho Payega on ZEE5
 

2018 Indian television series debuts
Indian television soap operas
Zee TV original programming
Indian drama television series